Dudua is a genus of moths belonging to the subfamily Olethreutinae of the family Tortricidae.

Species
Dudua adocima Diakonoff, 1981
Dudua anaprobola (Bradley, 1953)
Dudua anisoptera Clarke, 1976
Dudua aprobola (Meyrick, 1886)
Dudua atriphraga (Diakonoff, 1968)
Dudua brachytoma Diakonoff, 1973
Dudua carpophora Diakonoff, 1973
Dudua charadraea (Meyrick, 1909)
Dudua chlorohygra Diakonoff, 1973
Dudua crossotoma (Meyrick, 1931)
Dudua cyclographa Diakonoff, 1973
Dudua dissectiformis Yu & Li, 2006
Dudua eumenica (Meyrick, 1928)
Dudua hemigrapta (Meyrick, 1931)
Dudua hemitypa Diakonoff, 1983
Dudua hesperialis Walker, 1864
Dudua iniqua (Meyrick, 1921)
Dudua lamproterma Diakonoff, 1973
Dudua metacyma Diakonoff, 1973
Dudua microsema Diakonoff, 1973
Dudua perornata Diakonoff, 1973
Dudua perusta Diakonoff, 1983
Dudua phyllanthana (Meyrick, 1881)
Dudua piratodes (Meyrick, 1930)
Dudua proba Diakonoff, 1973
Dudua proxima Clarke, 1976
Dudua setilegula Razowski & Wojtusiak, 2012
Dudua scaeaspis (Meyrick in Caradja & Meyrick, 1937)
Dudua siderea (Turner, 1916)
Dudua tectigera (Meyrick, 1910)
Dudua tetanota (Meyrick, 1909)
Dudua ultima Diakonoff, 1973

See also
List of Tortricidae genera

References

External links
tortricidae.com

Olethreutini
Tortricidae genera